David Samuels may refer to:

 David Samuels (political scientist), political science professor
 David Samuels (writer) (born 1967), American author
 Dave Samuels, American musician

See also
David Samuel (disambiguation)